The Northwestern–Notre Dame football rivalry is an American college football rivalry between the Northwestern Wildcats and Notre Dame Fighting Irish.

History
Starting in the 1920s, Northwestern and Notre Dame played for a Shillelagh until the mid-1970s. The trophy game was created at the behest of Notre Dame head coach Knute Rockne, who wanted a rivalry in the Chicago metropolitan area to help build Notre Dame's fanbase there.

The game decided the national championship in 1930, and Notre Dame victories cost Northwestern national championships in 1926 and 1936. The two schools stopped playing regularly in the 1970s, though the rivalry was renewed from 1992 to 1995. When Northwestern stunned No. 8 Notre Dame 17–15 as a 28-point underdog in 1995, the Chicago Sun-Times billed it as the "Upset of the Century."

In 2014, the rivalry was renewed in a two-game series, with Northwestern winning 43–40 in overtime in South Bend. It gave Northwestern only their second winning streak against the Irish since they won four straight from 1959–62. Notre Dame traveled to Evanston in November 2018 for their first encounter on the Wildcats' home turf since 1976. The Fighting Irish got their revenge for the Wildcats overtime upset in South Bend four years prior, winning 31-21 at Ryan Field.  Notre Dame leads the series 38–9–2.

Game results

See also  
 List of NCAA college football rivalry games

References

College football rivalries in the United States
Northwestern Wildcats football
Notre Dame Fighting Irish football